Steven Anderson Imbiri (born April 30, 1987) is an Indonesian professional football player.

References

External links
Steven Anderson Imbiri at Liga Indonesia

1987 births
Living people
People from West Papua (province)
Indonesian footballers
Liga 1 (Indonesia) players
Persiram Raja Ampat players
Indonesian Christians
PSIM Yogyakarta players
MISC-MIFA players
PSIS Semarang players
Persiba Bantul players
Persela Lamongan players
Bali United F.C. players
Indonesian Premier Division players
Association football wingers